Angelica Bella (born Gabriella Piroska Mészáros; 15 February 1968 – 7 May 2021) was a Hungarian pornographic actress. She worked primarily and enjoyed her greatest popularity in Italy.

Career
Bella began her career in the adult film industry under the pseudonym Gabriella Dari. She worked with various German producers in the early 1990s.

Bella has only appeared in a handful of hardcore videos in the United States. She first turned up in two American adult films in 1992: The Anal-Europe Series 1 and 2. In Anal-Europe 1, Angelica Bella performed in a scene with Tom Byron and Joey Silvera.  Angelica Bella then returned to European porn for a time, but returned to American screens in 1995 with a string of performances in movies such as Angel's Vengeance and Kinky Villa.

Awards
 1993 Hot d'Or - Best European Actress

References

External links 
 
 
 

1968 births
2021 deaths
Hungarian pornographic film actresses
People from Szabolcs-Szatmár-Bereg County